Yekaterina Konstantinovna Abramova (born 14 April 1982) is a Russian speed skater who won a bronze medal in the women's team pursuit at the 2006 Winter Olympics.

Personal records
To put these personal records in perspective, the WR column lists the official world records on the dates that Abramova skated her personal records.

Abramova has an Adelskalender score of 164.137 points.

References

External links 
 Yekaterina Abramova at SkateResults.com
 Yekaterina Abramova. Deutsche Eisschnelllauf Gemeinschaft e.V. (German Skating Association).
 Personal records from Jakub Majerski's Speedskating Database
 Evert Stenlund's Adelskalender pages
 Historical World Records. International Skating Union.

1982 births
Living people
Speed skaters at the 2006 Winter Olympics
Speed skaters at the 2010 Winter Olympics
Olympic bronze medalists for Russia
Olympic speed skaters of Russia
Sportspeople from Saint Petersburg
Olympic medalists in speed skating
Russian female speed skaters
Medalists at the 2006 Winter Olympics